"A Certain Slant of Light" is a song by Canadian rock band The Tea Party. It was released as a single in Australia, where it peaked at #60 on the ARIA singles chart in May 1994, and as a promotional single in Canada. The music video was shot in the Sydney suburbs of Kurnell and Kings Cross, was directed by Floria Sigismondi, and features some of The Tea Party's Australian tour management personnel.

"A Certain Slant of Light" is a standard three-piece rock composition with lyrics referencing drug addiction. Its title is derived from the title of a poem by Emily Dickinson, "There's a certain Slant of light".

The music video for this single is notable as Floria Sigismondi's directorial debut.

Track listing 
"A Certain Slant of Light" (edit)
"Winter Solstice"
"Save Me"
"Watching what the Rain Blows in"

Charts

References 

1994 singles
The Tea Party songs
1993 songs
EMI Records singles
Music videos directed by Floria Sigismondi